In structural engineering, a shear wall is a vertical element of a system that is designed to resist in-plane lateral forces, typically wind and seismic loads. In many jurisdictions, the International Building Code and International Residential Code govern the design of shear walls.

A shear wall resists loads parallel to the plane of the wall. Collectors, also known as drag members, transfer the diaphragm shear to shear walls and other vertical elements of the seismic force resisting system. Shear walls are typically light-framed or braced wooden walls with shear panels, reinforced concrete walls, reinforced masonry walls, or steel plates.

Plywood is the conventional material used in wood (timber) shear walls, but with advances in technology and modern building methods, other prefabricated options have made it possible to inject shear assemblies into narrow walls that fall at either side of an opening. Sheet steel and steel-backed shear panels in the place of structural plywood in shear walls has proved to provide stronger seismic resistance.

Structural design considerations

Loading and failure mechanisms 

A shear wall is stiffer in its principal axis than it is in the other axis. It is considered as a primary structure which provides relatively stiff resistance to vertical and horizontal forces acting in its plane. Under this combined loading condition, a shear wall develops compatible axial, shear, torsional and flexural strains, resulting in a complicated internal stress distribution. In this way, loads are transferred vertically to the building's foundation. Therefore, there are four critical failure mechanisms; as shown in Figure 1. The factors determining the failure mechanism include geometry, loading, material properties, restraint, and construction.

Slenderness ratio 

The slenderness ratio of a wall is defined as a function of the effective height divided by either the effective thickness or the radius of the gyration of the wall section. It is highly related to the slenderness limit that is the cut-off between elements being classed "slender" or "stocky". Slender walls are vulnerable to buckling failure modes, including Euler in-plane buckling due to axial compression, Euler out-of-plane buckling due to axial compression and lateral torsional buckling due to bending moment. In the design process, structural engineers need to consider all these failure modes to ensure that the wall design is safe under various kinds of possible loading conditions.

Coupling effect of shear walls 

In actual structural systems, the shear walls may function as a coupled system instead of isolated walls depending on their arrangements and connections. Two neighboring wall panels can be considered coupled when the interface transfers longitudinal shear to resist the deformation mode. This stress arises whenever a section experiences a flexural or restrained warping stress and its magnitude is dependent on the stiffness of the coupling element. Depending on this stiffness, the performance of a coupled section will fall between that of an ideal uniform element of similar gross plan cross-section and the combined performance of the independent component parts. Another advantage of coupling is that it enhances the overall flexural stiffness dis-proportionally to shear stiffness, resulting in smaller shear deformation.

Arrangement in buildings with different functions 
The location of a shear wall significantly affects the building function, such as natural ventilation and daylighting performance. The performance requirements vary for buildings of different functions.

Hotel and dormitory buildings 

Hotel or dormitory buildings require many partitions, allowing insertions of shear walls. In these structures, traditional cellular construction (Figure 2) is preferred and a regular wall arrangement with transverse cross walls between rooms and longitudinal spine walls flanking a central corridor is used.

Commercial buildings 

A structure of shear walls in the center of a large building—often encasing an elevator shaft or stairwell—form a shear core. In multi-storey commercial buildings, shear walls form at least one core (Figure 3). From a building services perspective, the shear core houses communal services including stairs, lifts, toilets and service risers. Building serviceability requirements necessitates a proper arrangement of a shear core. From the structural point of view, a shear core could strengthen the building's resistance to lateral loads, i.e., wind load and seismic load, and significantly increase the building safety.

Construction methods—concrete 

Concrete shear walls are reinforced with both horizontal and vertical reinforcement (Figure 4). A reinforcement ratio is defined as the ratio of the gross concrete area for a section taken orthogonal to the reinforcement. Construction codes of practice define maximum and minimum amounts of reinforcement as well as the detailing of steel bars. Common construction methods for in-situ reinforced concrete walls include traditional shuttered lifts, slip form, jump form and tunnel form.

Shuttered lifts method 
The traditional shuttered lifts method should be used when the total number of walls is small or the arrangement is irregular. In this method, walls are formed one story at one time together with the columns. Although it is slow, this technique may produce a premium finish quality or texture.

Slip form method 
Slip forming is method of concrete placement whereby a moving form is used to create a continuous wall extrusion. This method is very efficient for well-suited structures, such as flanged and core wall systems. A very accurate wall thickness can be achieved but the surface is rough because of the abrasion of the form on the walls.

Jump form method 
Jump forming, also known as climbing forming, is a method of construction whereby the walls are cast in discrete lifts. It is a stop-start process with day joints formed at each lift level. Similar to slip forming, jump forming is only efficient for structures with repetition of wall arrangement. Moreover, it is convenient for adding connections and extrusions at the floor level due to the discrete features. Nevertheless, the inclusion of day joints leaves higher chances for defects and imperfections.

Tunnel form method 
Tunnel form construction uses a formwork system to cast slabs and walls as a single pour operation. It is suitable for cellular structures with regular repetition of both horizontal and vertical members. The advantage of this method is that the construction can progress vertically and horizontally at the same time, thereby increasing the integrity and stability of the structure.

Nonplanar shear walls 

Due to functional requirements, the designer may choose non planar sections like C,L as opposed to the planar sections like rectangular/bar bell sections. Nonplanar sections require 3D analysis and are a research area.

Modeling techniques 
Modeling techniques have been progressively updated during the last two decades, moving from linear static to nonlinear dynamic, enabling more realistic representation of global behavior, and different failure modes. Different modeling techniques shear walls span from macro models such as modified beam-column elements, to micro models such as 3D finite element models. An appropriate modeling technique should:

 Be capable of predicting the inelastic response  
 Incorporating important materials characteristics
 Simulate behavioural feature: Lap splice and Bar Slip
 Represent the migration of the neutral axis
 Tension stiffening
 Interaction of flexure and shear actions

Different models have been developed over time, including macro-models, vertical line element models, finite-element models, and multi-layer models. More recently, fiber-section beam-columns elements have become popular, as they can model most of the global response and failure modes properly, while avoiding sophistications associated with finite element models.

Methods of analysis 

 Finite element method
 Stringer panel model

See also 

 Hold down
 Earthquake engineering

References

External links 
 

Structural system
Earthquake engineering
Construction